David Gilbert (born 12 June 1981) is an English professional snooker player. He is a former World Snooker Young Player of Distinction and practises at Potters Snooker and Pool Club in Swadlincote, Derbyshire, a club which he co-owns.

Having never previously been beyond the last 16 of a ranking event, Gilbert reached the final of the 2015 International Championship where he lost 5–10 to John Higgins. On 22 January 2019 he hit the milestone of the 147th maximum break in the Championship League. On 4 May 2019 he narrowly missed out on his first ever World Snooker Championship final in a final frame decider, losing out 16–17 to John Higgins. On 13 August 2021 Gilbert won his first world ranking title after 22 years of being a professional by winning the 2021 Championship League after beating Mark Allen 3–1 in the final.

Snooker career

Early career
Gilbert began his professional career by playing UK Tour in 1999, at the time the second-level professional tour. In the 2007–08 season Gilbert reached the last 32 of three tournaments without progressing further. Most notably he qualified for the 2007 World Championship where he led Stephen Hendry 5–1, before succumbing to a 7–10 defeat. To qualify he beat Alfie Burden, Gerard Greene and Mark King.

The other two were the 2007 Welsh Open – where he won his two qualifying matches then beat James Wattana in the last 48 in Newport, before losing 5–0 to Steve Davis – and the 2008 Grand Prix, where he again faced Hendry and again challenged him before succumbing 5–4.

Gilbert went one better at the 2009 Welsh Open, beating Mark Williams and Joe Perry before losing to Mark Selby in the last 16.

2011/2012 season

The 2011–12 season was somewhat of a breakthrough year for Gilbert as he reached the last 16 in two ranking event tournaments for the first time. He went from qualifying round one to the venue stage of the first tournament of the year, the Australian Goldfields Open, beating Passakorn Suwannawat 5–4, Alfie Burden 5–2, Dave Harold 5–4 and Mark King 5–0 to set up a wildcard round match at the venue against James Mifsud, which was later changed to a last 32 encounter due to the withdrawal of Graeme Dott. Gilbert won 5–1 to meet Mark Williams in the last 16, and was beaten 2–5.

Gilbert struggled to replicate the form he showed in Australia until the final and biggest tournament on the snooker calendar, the World Championship. He qualified with victories over Stuart Carrington, Jimmy Robertson (with a final frame decider), Mike Dunn and Fergal O'Brien and drew 11th seed Martin Gould in the first round. There he won his first-ever match at the Crucible 10–8, although he had to withstand two comebacks after leading 6–2 and 9–5. In the second round he was defeated by 2010 World Champion, Neil Robertson 9–13. Gilbert had led 3–1 after the first four frames, but then trailed 3–5 and 6–10 after the first and second session respectively. He finished the season ranked world number 57, inside the top 64 who automatically retained their places for the 2012–13 season.

2012/2013 season

Following on from Gilbert's successful 2011/2012 season, he struggled for form this season as he could only qualify for the World Open in Haikou, China. There, he beat Lu Ning 5–0 in the wildcard round, before losing 4–5 to Matthew Stevens in the first round. Gilbert played in eight of the ten minor-ranking Players Tour Championship events, but could only win three matches all year, to finish a lowly 86th on the Order of Merit. He couldn't repeat last season's run to The Crucible as he was defeated 6–10 by Marco Fu in the final round of World Championship Qualifying. He ended the campaign ranked world number 41.

2013/2014 season
Gilbert's 2013–14 season was his most consistent year to date as he qualified for all but two of the ranking events. In his opening match, he defeated Jak Jones 5–3 to qualify for the 2013 Wuxi Classic in China where he beat Andrew Pagett 5–2 in the first round. He went on to beat Alan McManus 5–2 to reach the last 16 of a ranking event for the fourth time but lost 5–2 to Joe Perry. A month later at the minor-ranking Rotterdam Open, he defeated Ryan Day 4–3 in the last 16 and Stephen Maguire 4–1 in the quarter-finals. Gilbert led Mark Selby 2–0 in his semi-final match, but was beaten 4–3. The tournament was one of the eight European Tour events on the calendar and Gilbert performed well in the others with two further last 16 runs to finish 16th on the Order of Merit and qualify for the Finals for the first time in his career. There, Gilbert gained revenge over Selby by whitewashing him 4–0, but lost 4–1 to Perry in the second round.

Gilbert played in his third World Championship this year after seeing off Jimmy Robertson in the final round of qualifying. He faced the previous year's runner-up Barry Hawkins in the first round but from 4–2 up he lost eight frames in a row to succumb to a 10–4 defeat in a performance he branded as useless.

2014/2015 season

Gilbert lost 5–3 to Stephen Maguire in the first round of the 2014 Wuxi Classic and then failed to qualify for the next two ranking events. At the International Championship he defeated Zak Surety 6–4, before withstanding three century breaks from Marco Fu to take the match into a deciding frame which Gilbert lost. He won his first matches at the UK Championship 6–4 against Elliot Slessor and 6–2 against Mark Joyce, but lost in the third round 6–2 to David Morris. Gilbert was eliminated at the first round stage of the German Masters, Welsh Open and Indian Open. He faced the winner of the previous ranking event Joe Perry at the China Open and won the last three frames to defeat him 5–3 and then saw off Zhou Yuelong 5–2 to reach the last 16 of a ranking event for the sixth time. Gilbert's tournament ended with a 5–2 loss to reigning world champion Mark Selby. Gilbert was ranked 35th after the World Championship, the highest he had finished a season at that time.

2015/2016 season
Gilbert was eliminated in the qualifying rounds of the opening two ranking events of the season. At the minor-ranking Ruhr Open he won four matches to play in the quarter-finals where he beat Barry Hawkins 4–2, before losing 4–3 to Tian Pengfei in the semis. Gilbert's form continued later in to the month at the International Championship as he knocked out Xiao Guodong 6–5, Oliver Lines 6–4 and Ryan Day 6–4 to play in the first ranking event quarter-final of his career. He came back from 4–2 down against Marco Fu to edge it 6–5 which included a 130 break and then saw off Thepchaiya Un-Nooh 9–5. In the final, Gilbert was level with John Higgins at 4–4, but would lose 9–5. The £65,000 runner-up's cheque is by far the biggest of his career and he moved up to 21st in the world rankings afterwards. Gilbert stated that his newfound form was down to a new cue he acquired from fellow professional Matthew Selt six weeks previously. Gilbert was knocked out in the third round of both the UK Championship and China Open 6–3 to Marco Fu and 5–3 to Higgins respectively. Gilbert won three matches to qualify for the World Championship and faced Ronnie O'Sullivan in the first round. He was defeated 10–7, but said it was the best he had ever played without winning a match. He moved up to world number 22 at the end of the season.

2016/2017 season

Gilbert saw off Rod Lawler 5–0, Zhou Yuelong 5–2 and Zhang Anda 5–0 to play in the quarter-finals of the World Open, where he was beaten 5–2 by Neil Robertson. He had a pair of 6–2 victories over Adam Duffy and Mark Joyce at the UK Championship and made two centuries from 3–0 down against Ali Carter to edge through 6–5. Gilbert lost 6–2 to Jamie Jones in the fourth round. He won two matches to qualify for the German Masters and eliminated Marco Fu 5–3 in the first round, but was then defeated 5–4 by Stuart Bingham despite holding a 4–2 advantage at one stage. After being 6–1 up on Fergal O'Brien in the final qualifying round for the World Championship the scores were locked at 9–9. The decider took 123 minutes and 41 seconds, breaking the record for the longest frame in snooker history, with O'Brien taking it on the final brown. He finished the season 19th in the world rankings, his highest to that date.

2021/2022 season
David Gilbert won his first ranking title at the 2021 Championship League. He defeated Mark Allen in the final 3–1. He made strong breaks of 59 in frame 2 and 57 in frame 4. Gilbert's strong start to the season continued at the following tournament, the 2021 British Open, where he reached the quarter-finals, losing 3–4 to eventual runner-up Gary Wilson, despite leading 2–0 and 3–2. Gilbert also performed well in the qualifying held across August and September for the 2021 Northern Ireland, English, and Scottish opens, defeating Ian Burns, David Grace, and Simon Lichtenberg, 4–0, 4–2, and 4–1 respectively.

Personal life
Gilbert is married, and he and his wife Abigail have a daughter. He often helps out on his father's potato and general farm in Staffordshire and had planned to do so during the 2007 World Championships, had he not qualified for the event.

Performance and rankings timeline

Career finals

Ranking finals: 5 (1 title)

Non-ranking finals: 1 (1 title)

References

External links

David Gilbert at worldsnooker.com

1981 births
English snooker players
Living people
Sportspeople from Derby
Sportspeople from Tamworth, Staffordshire